Bridgework is an album by American jazz drummer Billy Higgins recorded in 1980 and 1986 and released on the Contemporary label.

Reception

The AllMusic review by Scott Yanow states "the music overall is excellent hard bop with some strong moments but no major surprises".

Track listing
 "Deceptakon" (Charles 'Buster' Williams)  
 "I Hear a Rhapsody" (George Fragos, Dick Gasparre, Jack Baker)  
 "Plexus (Cedar Walton)  
 "Evidence" (Thelonious Monk)  
 "Bridgework" (Walton)  
 "Old Folks" (Willard Robison, Dedette Lee Hill)  
 "The Theme" (Harold Land)

Personnel
Billy Higgins - drums
James Clay (tracks 4-6), Harold Land (tracks 1-3 & 7) - tenor saxophone
Cedar Walton - piano
Tony Dumas (tracks 4-6), Buster Williams (tracks 1-3 & 7) - bass

References 

Contemporary Records albums
Billy Higgins albums
1986 albums